Nerocila is a genus of parasitic isopod crustaceans, with 11 species, which have been found parasitizing Indian marine fishes.

Species 
The 42 recognized species are:

References 

Cymothoida
Isopod genera
Taxa named by William Elford Leach